

Seasons
The table below chronicles the achievements of Pegah Gilan every season, from 2002 to 2008.

Key

P = Played
W = Games won
D = Games drawn
L = Games lost
F = Goals for
A = Goals against
Pts = Points
Pos = Final position

IPL = Iran Pro League
Div 1 = Azadegan League

See also 
Pegah F.C.
Damash Gilan
Azadegan League
Iran Pro League
Hazfi Cup

References
 Iran Premier League Stats]

Pegah